Östersjöfestivalen or Baltic Song Contest is an annual song contest held for the states along the Baltic Sea. The annual host city is Karlshamn in Sweden. The first contest was held in 1978.

List of Countries

Wins

References

Karlshamn Municipality
Song contests
Recurring events established in 1978